The year 1990 in science and technology involved some significant events.

Astronomy and space exploration
 January 24 – Japan launches the Hiten spacecraft, the first lunar probe launched by a country other than the Soviet Union or the United States.
 February 14 – The Pale Blue Dot photograph of Earth is sent back from the Voyager 1 probe after completing its primary mission, from around 3.5 billion miles away.
 April 24 – The Space Shuttle Discovery places the Hubble Space Telescope into orbit.
 August 16 – Steven Balbus makes his first discovery leading to elucidation of magnetorotational instability.
 October 13 – Earth-grazing meteoroid of 13 October 1990: A 44 kilogram, 41.5 km/s meteoroid passes above Czechoslovakia and Poland at 97.9 km. It is the first time calculations of the orbit of such a body based on photographic records from two distant places is made.

Biology
 The term "rewilding" is first used in print.

Computer science
 February – Adobe Photoshop 1.0 graphics software, devised by Thomas Knoll, is released.
 May 22 - Windows 3.0 is shipped by Microsoft
 November 12 – Tim Berners-Lee publishes a more formal proposal for the World Wide Web.
 November 13 – The first known web page is written.
 Approx. November 22 – Satoshi Tajiri begins creating the first Pokémon game.

History of science
 Thomas W. Laqueur publishes Making Sex: Body and Gender From the Greeks to Freud (Harvard University Press).

Mathematics
 Alan E. Gelfand and Adrian Smith publish a paper drawing attention to the significance of the Gibbs sampler technique for Bayesian numerical integration problems.
 Victor Kolyvagin introduces Euler systems.
 Ruth Lawrence publishes a paper on homological representations of the Hecke algebra, introducing, among other things, certain novel linear representations of the braid group, the Lawrence–Krammer representation.

Paleontology
 August 12 – "Sue", the best preserved Tyrannosaurus rex specimen ever found, is discovered in South Dakota by Sue Hendrickson.

Physiology and medicine
 June 25 – Cruzan v. Director, Missouri Department of Health decided in the Supreme Court of the United States allowing public officials to intervene in questions of termination of life support in the absence of an advance healthcare directive.
 The Human Genome Project is founded.
 The first evidence for the existence of the BRCA gene encoding for a DNA repair enzyme involved in breast cancer susceptibility Is provided by Mary-Claire King's laboratory at University of California, Berkeley.

Psychology
 Roger Shepard's Mind Sights presents the "Shepard tables" illusion.

Awards
 Fields Prize in Mathematics: Vladimir Drinfeld, Vaughan Frederick Randal Jones, Shigefumi Mori and Edward Witten
 Nobel Prizes
 Physics – Jerome Isaac Friedman, Henry Way Kendall and Richard E. Taylor
 Chemistry – Elias James Corey
 Medicine – Joseph E. Murray and E. Donnall Thomas
 Turing Award – Fernando J. Corbató

Births
 September 28 – Nadim Kobeissi, Lebanese computer science researcher

Deaths
 January 4 – Prof. Doc Edgerton, (b. 1903), American electrical engineer.
 January 14 – Rosalind Pitt-Rivers (b. 1907), English biochemist.
 January 26 – Lewis Mumford (b. 1895), American historian and philosopher of science.
 February 19 – Edris Rice-Wray Carson (b. 1904), American-born physician, pioneer in family planning.
 March 20 – Victor Rothschild, 3rd Baron Rothschild (b. 1910), English polymath.
 March 22 – Gerald Bull (b. 1928), Canadian engineer.
 March 24 – An Wang (b. 1920), Chinese American computer designer.
 May 30 – Ora Mendelsohn Rosen (b. 1935), American biomedical researcher.
 August 18 – B. F. Skinner (b. 1904), American behavioral psychologist.
 September 2 – John Bowlby (b. 1907), English child psychologist and pioneer of attachment theory.
 October 9 – Murray Bowen (b. 1913), American psychiatrist and pioneer of family therapy.
 October 17 – Hans Freudenthal (b. 1905), Dutch mathematician.
 November 19 – Georgy Flyorov (b. 1913), Russian physicist known for his discovery of the spontaneous fission.

References

 
20th century in science
1990s in science